Pseudohypoxia refers to increased cytosolic ratio of free NAD to NADH in cells, caused by hyperglycemia.
Research has shown that declining levels of NAD+ during aging cause pseudohypoxia, and that raising nuclear NAD+ in old mice reverses pseudohypoxia and metabolic dysfunction, thus reversing the aging process. It is expected that human NAD trials will begin in 2014.

Pseudohypoxia is a feature commonly noted in poorly-controlled diabetes.

See also 
 Hypoxia (medical)
 Hypoxia (disambiguation) - list under Hypoxia (medical) e.g Intrauterine hypoxia

References 

Cell biology
Medical signs
Geriatrics
Senescence